Eriastrum pluriflorum is a species of flowering plant in the phlox family known by the common names Tehachapi woollystar and many-flowered eriastrum.

Distribution
This wildflower is endemic to California where it is an uncommon resident of varied chaparral and woodland habitats in the central part of the state from the Inner South California Coast Ranges and northwestern Transverse Ranges, across the San Joaquin Valley to the Sierra Nevada and Tehachapi Mountains, and into the western Mojave Desert.

Description
This is a small annual plant, Eriastrum pluriflorum, which may be anywhere from 2 to 25 centimeters in height, forming an erect bunch or a small patch on the ground. Its stem has the occasional narrow, thready leaf a few centimeters in length and coated in woolly hairs.

The inflorescence is a mass of spindly bracts strung thickly with dense, cobwebby wool and bearing many distinctive trumpet-shaped flowers. Each flower has a very narrow throat tube one to two centimeters long ending in a flat faced corolla. The centimeter-wide corolla has five rounded to diamond-shaped lobes which are bright lavender to blue. The throat of the flower may be the same color or yellowish to reddish. The light-colored stamens protrude from the corolla.

Subspecies
Subspecies include: 
Eriastrum pluriflorum ssp. pluriflorum 
Eriastrum pluriflorum ssp. sherman-hoytiae — Many flowered eriastrum — endemic to the Mojave Desert.

References

External links
Calflora Database: Eriastrum pluriflorum (Tehachapi woollystar,  many flowered eriastrum)
Jepson Manual Treatment: Eriastrum pluriflorum
Eriastrum pluriflorum - U.C. Photo gallery

pluriflorum
Endemic flora of California
Flora of the California desert regions
Flora of the Sierra Nevada (United States)
Natural history of the California chaparral and woodlands
Natural history of the California Coast Ranges
Natural history of the Central Valley (California)
Natural history of the Mojave Desert
Natural history of the Transverse Ranges
~
Flora without expected TNC conservation status